Linn Marie Ploug Thomsen (born 13 July 1999) is a Danish ice hockey player and member of the Danish national ice hockey team, currently playing with the Hvidovre IK Kvinder of the Danish KvindeLigaen and Swedish Damettan. During the 2019–20 and 2020–21 seasons, she played with the LIU Sharks women's ice hockey program in the New England Women's Hockey Alliance (NEWHA) conference of the NCAA Division I.

Ploug Thomsen represented Denmark at the Division I Group A tournaments of the IIHF Women's World Championship in 2015, 2016, 2017, 2018, and 2019, and at the Top Division tournament in 2021. As a junior player with the Danish national under-18 team, she participated in the Division I Qualification tournament of the IIHF Women's U18 World Championship in 2015, the Division I tournament in 2016, and the Division I Group B tournament in 2017.

References

External links
 

Living people
1999 births
People from Hvidovre Municipality
Danish women's ice hockey defencemen
LIU Sharks women's ice hockey players
Danish expatriate ice hockey people
Danish expatriate sportspeople in the United States
Expatriate ice hockey players in the United States
Sportspeople from the Capital Region of Denmark